The 2005 Next Generation Hardcourts was a men's Association of Tennis Professionals tennis tournament held in Adelaide, Australia  that was part of the International Series of the 2005 ATP Tour. Second-seeded Joachim Johansson won his first title of the year and the 2nd of his career.

Finals

Singles

 Joachim Johansson defeated  Taylor Dent 7–5, 6–3

Doubles

 Xavier Malisse /  Olivier Rochus defeated  Simon Aspelin /  Todd Perry 7–6(7–5), 6–4

References

External links
 ITF tournament edition details

 
Next Generation Hardcourts
2000s in Adelaide
January 2005 sports events in Australia